Cara Butler  is an American stepdancer and choreographer. She is the younger sister of dancer Jean Butler.

Dance career
Cara Butler studied with the widely respected Irish stepdance teacher Donny Golden.  She and her sister, Jean, each won numerous national titles and regional titles, and placed well in international competitions. She has toured with the Irish folk group The Chieftains since 1992 performing traditional and contemporary Irish dances.

In 1999, Butler performed alongside her sister as a featured dancer in "Dancing on Dangerous Ground" which played in the Theater Royal in London's West End. In 2005 she danced once again with her sister for the instructional DVD Irish Dance Masterclass with Jean Butler along with Tara Barry, Michael Patrick Gallagher, and Glenn Simpson.

Butler was the lead dancer in the Folgers coffee commercial "A Dancer's Morning".

References

External links
 Newsbank.com (paywall)

American female dancers
American dancers
Performers of Irish dance
American choreographers
Living people
Place of birth missing (living people)
1974 births
21st-century American women